Cyber Trance Presents Ayu Trance is a remix album by Ayumi Hamasaki that contains remixes in the trance genre. The album was released on September 27, 2001.

On October 8th, 2021, the album was rereleased as Cyber Trance Presents Ayu Trance -COMPLETE EDITION- on music streaming services to celebrate the 20th anniversary of its release. This edition contains previously unreleased remix versions.

Tracklisting (2001 Version)
 Depend on You "Svenson & Gielen Mix"
 M "Above & Beyond Mix"
 Trauma "Jam X & De Leon's DuMonde remix"
 Unite! "Airwave remix"
 Surreal "Marc et Claude remix"
 Audience "Darren Tate remix"
 Fly High "Voodoo & Serano remix"
 Immature "Koglin & Heath remix"
 Evolution "Goldenscan remix"
 Kanariya "Ferry Corsten's system F remix"
 Appears "Armin Van Buuren's Rising Star remix"
 Boys & Girls "Push remix"
 Unite! "Moogwai remix"
 A Song for XX "Ferry Corsten Chilled Mix"

Chart positions

Total Sales: 302,000 (Japan)

Cyber Trance presents Ayu Trance 2 is a remix album by Japanese recording artist Ayumi Hamasaki. It was released the same day as Hamasaki's 28th single "Voyage".

Information
The album is a sequel of Ayu Trance, and the songs of the album are in non-stop format. Half of the songs had been previously unreleased at the time of the release of the album, and it premiered remixes from the album I am... and from the then-unreleased album Rainbow. The other half were songs had been included in the first Ayu Trance album, like the remixes of Above & Beyond, Armin van Buuren, Push and Voodoo & Serano.

The versions used in this album were club/extended versions. Remix versions of "Free & Easy", "I am..." and "Daybreak" have been only included in this album. The radio edit versions of remixes of "Independent", "Hanabi", "July 1st" were later included in Ayu Trance. However, with the exception of the extended club version of the Lange remix of "Hanabi" -which was released only through promotional vinyls at the time of this album's release- all other original extended versions of these remixes remain unreleased.

Tracklisting (2021 Version) 
"Independent" "D-Nation remix"
"Hanabi" "Lange remix"
"M" "Above & Beyond Remix"
"July 1st" "Flip & Fill remix"
"Dearest" ~Rank 1 remix~
"Free & Easy" "Minimalistix remix"
"Unite!" "Airwave remix"
"Connected" "Ferry Corsten System F Mix"
"Fly High" "Voodoo & Serano remix"
"Audience" "Darren Tate remix"
"Trauma" "JamX & De Leon's DuMonde Dub Mix"
"Boys & Girls" "Push remix"
"I am..." "Ramon Zenker remix"
"Appears" "Armin van Buuren's Sunset Dub"
"Depend on You" "Svenson & Gielen remix"
"Daybreak" "Orion Too remix"

Chart positions

Total Sales: 237,800 (Japan)

External links
 CYBER trance presents ayu trance 2 information at Avex Network.
 CYBER trance presents ayu trance 2 information at Oricon.

Ayumi Hamasaki remix albums
2001 remix albums
2002 remix albums
Trance remix albums